Made Out of Babies was a sludge metal band from Brooklyn, New York formed in 2004 that disbanded in 2012.

Biography
Drawing equally from noise rock bands such as The Jesus Lizard and post-metal bands such as Isis, the band developed a following after the release of their debut album, Trophy. Their first two albums were released by Neurot Recordings, the label of post-metal and post-rock bands like Isis, Neurosis, and Red Sparowes. Made Out of Babies were signed to The End Records for the release of their 2008 album The Ruiner. On March 13, 2012, lead singer Julie Christmas posted on her Facebook page that the band was no longer together. On September 18, 2012, the new band Bad Powers - featuring Tobin, Cooper, and Egan with new singer Megan Tweed - released its debut album on The End Records.

Members
Matthew Egan (Cleanteeth) – drums
Brendan "Bunny" Tobin (Red Sparowes) – guitar
Julie Christmas (Battle of Mice) – vocals
Eric Cooper (Strangelight, Pushmen, Bad Powers, Kiss It Goodbye, J.J. Paradise Players Club, Pigs.) – bass guitar
Viva Stowell (Pimpslap, 4Q) - bass guitar

Discography

Albums
Trophy (2005, Neurot Recordings)
Coward (2006, Neurot Recordings)
The Ruiner (2008, The End Records)

EPs
Triad (split with Red Sparowes and Battle of Mice) (2006, Neurot Recordings)

Compilations
 We Reach: The Music of the Melvins (a 2005 tribute album to the Melvins, Fractured Transmitter Recording Company)
 NYC Sucks, Volume 1 (2010 compilation of bands from the New York metal scene by MetalSucks.net. The compilation featured "Invisible Ink")
 Monster CD No 13

References
 New Album Release Date
 Live performance at Union Hall in Brooklyn

External links
www.punknews.org
www.dustedmagazine.com
Made Out of Babies at Myspace

Heavy metal musical groups from New York (state)
American post-hardcore musical groups
American post-metal musical groups
American sludge metal musical groups